Dhananjayan may refer to:
 G. Dhananjayan, a Tamil film producer
 Dhananjayan Sriskandarajah, the Secretary General of CIVICUS: World Alliance for Citizen Participation
 Vannadil Pudiyaveettil Dhananjayan and Shanta Dhananjayan, a dancing couple known as the Dhananjayans